Henry Shaver Westbrook (June 1842 – October 1913) was the eighth Mayor of Winnipeg in 1886.

After moving to Winnipeg in the mid-1870s, he established a vehicle and equipment business with Frank Fairchild. He defeated E. R. Crowe to become Mayor of Winnipeg in December 1885.

In 1959, Winnipeg renamed Victoria Street to Westbrook Street in his honour.

References

1842 births
1913 deaths
Mayors of Winnipeg
People from the County of Brant